is a Japanese collectible card game created by Bushiroad. The game is separated into Weiß-side and Schwarz-side. "Weiß" and "Schwarz" are German language for white and black, respectively.

Gameplay 

The game focuses on two main aspects: character battle and clock/level which regulate what cards can be played as well as acting as a player's life points.

Victory conditions 
 The player that forces his or her opponent to Level 4 wins the game immediately.
 The opposing player has no cards left in his or her deck and Waiting Room.

Playing Areas

Deck Area 

The player's deck is placed face down in this area and consists of 50 cards. Unlike other trading card games, the game does not end when a player runs out of cards in their deck. Instead, the player shuffles the cards in their waiting room to put back in the deck area.

Level Area 

Cards placed in this area represent the player's level. Upon reaching level 4, the player loses.

Clock Area 

When a player takes damage, the amount dealt is then added in cards to this area. This zone can hold up to six cards at time. When a seventh card is added, the player is forced to level up.

Stock Area 

Cards representing "Stock" are placed in this area. Cards in this area are placed faced down after trigger checks and cannot be revised or rearranged.

Climax Area 

A maximum of one face-up Climax card is allowed in this zone. During the end phase, any card in this area is sent to the Waiting Room.

Stage Area 

Consists of five stage positions. Character cards are placed face-up in these areas. There are two types of Stage Areas:

  Center Stage 
The three foremost positions make up the Center Stage. Character cards placed in this area can battle with opponent's Character cards directly in front of them.

 Back Stage  
The two rear positions make up the Back stage. Character cards placed in this area cannot battle with opponent's Character cards. However, cards in this usually possess support abilities.

Waiting Room 

Cards that have been retired/used are placed in this area. Example: Character cards defeated in battle.

Memory Area 

The cards that are removed from the game are placed in this area.

Phases 

Gameplay of Weiß Schwarz is broken into several phases during a players turn:

Stand phase 

All characters on the active player's Stage in [Rest] are returned to [Stand].

Draw phase 

The active player draws a card from the top of his deck.

Clock phase 

The active player may choose to discard one card from his hand into his/her Clock Area to draw 2 additional cards from his/her deck.

Main phase 

The phase where you play and move characters or event cards and activate start up abilities/effects.

When you play a card, you have to fulfill the three conditions (level, cost, and color) in order to play the card.

Climax phase 

Climax cards are played during this phase. You must have a card in either your Level Area or Clock Area that matches the color of the Climax card you wish to play in order to play it.

Battle phase 

The player declares an attack of choice with his/her characters one at a time to damage the opponent's life points (called "Clock" in Weiß Schwarz) and also their characters (if present) at the same time.
During the first turn of the game, the player who goes first may only declare an attack with one character.
Only Characters that are in [Stand] Position and in the Center Stage, the three foremost positions, can declare attacks.
Characters declaring attack will be put to [Rest] position from [Stand] position.
The 3 different types of Attack:
 Direct Attack
This attack is the default attack when a character is attacking an empty slot.
The attacking character will gain an additional Soul Damage to the Soul Damage total.
 Front Attack

The player may choose this attack when a character is attacking and there is a character opposing it. Battle between the characters will occur and the character with the lower Power will be put to [Reverse]. Characters that are put to [Reverse] will be sent to the Waiting Room during the Encore Phase unless otherwise stated. The Soul Damage total the attacking character deals to the opposing player is equal to the character's Soul plus any additional Soul as a result of the trigger phase. 
 Side Attack

The player may choose this attack when a character is attacking and there is a character opposing it. Battle between the characters will NOT occur. The attacking character will suffer a Soul Damage penalty that is equivalent to the Level of the opposing character. The Soul Damage total the attacking character deals to the opposing player is equal to the character's Soul minus the Level of the opposing character, plus any additional Soul as a result of the trigger phase.

Trigger phase 

Upon declaring an attack from front attack, side attack, or direct attack, a card is flipped over from your deck as trigger to check for trigger (effect varies upon trigger) and the card goes into stock. The trigger phase occurs with the attack of each character.

Counter phase 

If you declared a front attack, your opponent may play a character/event counter card, if they have one.

Damage phase 

Your opponent takes damage equivalent to your soul output + soul trigger upon trigger step (if any) by flipping over cards from the top of their deck onto their clock. 7 cards on the clock raises their level by 1, and any additional damage are retained onto the next level. However, should they flip over a climax card, all the damage sustained for that damage step is canceled, and the cards are moved into the Waiting Room (discard pile) instead.

Character battling phase 

This phase occurs only when a Front Attack is declared.
A Power comparison between the characters is done and the character with the lower Power is put to [Reverse].
If the Power of both battling characters are the same, both of them are put to [Reverse].

Encore phase 

This phase occurs when the current player has decided to stop attacking.
All Characters that are in the [Reverse] state are sent to the Waiting Room.
Starting with the current player, both players are allowed to "revive" their characters by paying the characters' respective Encore cost. 
Even when not stated, all character cards comes with a built-in ability [Auto] Encore (3), which means that a player may pay 3 cost from his/her stock to "revive" a character which has been put to [Reverse].
The Encored characters will be put back from the Waiting Room in [Rest] position to their original position on the Center Stage.

End phase 

You pass on your turn to the opponent.

Card type 

There are 3 main type of cards in Weiß Schwarz: character cards, event cards, and climax cards. They are further broken down into colors and level subcategories. A deck can contain up to four copies of cards with the same name, and no more than 8 climax cards per deck. The number of cards in a deck build is exactly 50.

Character cards 

Character cards form the base of the gameplay, serving as your means of damaging the opponent and subsequently defeating them. Character cards have several features which include the level and cost on the top left, soul trigger on the top right, effects, color, power, soul output and traits on the bottom of the card. To play a character, you have to meet the color requirement (applies only to card level 1 and above), the cost requirement, and the level requirement.

Event cards 

Event cards act as an instant play card during your main phase which may give functions like retrievals or healing effects. Event cards have to meet color and level requirements to be played.

Climax cards 

Climax cards boost your soul and power damage output during your climax phase upon play, increases soul output or resource advantage upon triggering on the trigger phase, and serve as a damage canceler during the damage phase. Due to the usefulness of climax cards, a deck is capped at 8 climaxes. Climax card have to meet the color requirement to be played during the climax phase.

Participating titles

Main titles

Weiß Side 

 A Certain Scientific Railgun S
 Angel Beats! & Kud Wafter Angel Beats! Re:Edit
 BanG Dream! BanG Dream! Volume 2
 BanG Dream! Girls Band Party! BanG Dream! Girls Band Party! Volume 2
 Cardcaptor Sakura: Clear Card Charlotte Da Capo del pula & Da Capo II
 Da Capo del pula & Da Capo II Plus Communication Da Capo III Da Capo 10th Anniversary Mix Dal Segno & Da Capo III With You
 Day Break Illusion - il sole penetra le illusioni
 Fujimi Fantasia Bunko
 Girl Friend Beta
 Girl Friend Beta Volume 2
 Is the Order a Rabbit??
 Is the Order a Rabbit?? Dear My Sister
 Index & Railgun Index II & Railgun
 Kadokawa Sneaker Bunko
 Kemono Friends
 KonoSuba: God's Blessing on this Wonderful World!
 KonoSuba: God's Blessing on this Wonderful World! 2
 KonoSuba: God's Blessing on this Wonderful World! Re:Edit
  KonoSuba: God's Blessing on this Wonderful World! Legend of Crimson
 Little Busters!
 Little Busters! Anime
 Little Busters! Ecstasy
 Love Live!
 Love Live! Volume 2
 Love Live! School Idol Festival
 Love Live! School Idol Festival Volume 2
 Love Live! School Idol Festival Volume 3 ~6th Anniversary~
 Love Live! Sunshine!!
 Love Live! Sunshine!! Volume 2
 Love Live! Sunshine!! School Idol Festival ~6th Anniversary~
 Love Live! Nijigasaki High School Idol Club feat. School Idol Festival All Stars
 Love Live! Nijigasaki High School Idol Club
 Lucky Star
 Magical Girl Lyrical Nanoha A's
 Magical Girl Lyrical Nanoha Detonation
 Magical Girl Lyrical Nanoha The MOVIE 1st & 2nd A's
 Magical Girl Lyrical Nanoha The MOVIE 2nd A's
 Magical Girl Lyrical Nanoha Reflection
 Magical Girl Lyrical Nanoha StrikerS
 Nisekoi
 Phantom ~Requiem for the Phantom~
 Puella Magi Madoka Magica
 Puella Magi Madoka Magica the Movie: Rebellion
 Puella Magi Madoka Side Story: Magia Record
 Rascal Does Not Dream of a Dreaming Girl
 Rascal Does Not Dream of Bunny Girl Senpai
 Rewrite
 Rewrite Anime
 Rewrite Harvest festa!
 Robotics;Notes
 Saekano: How to Raise a Boring Girlfriend
 Saekano: How to Raise a Boring Girlfriend Flat
 Shakugan no Shana
 Summer Pockets
 Symphogear
 Symphogear AXZ
 Symphogear G
 Symphogear GX
 Symphogear XD Unlimited
 Symphogear XD Unlimited Extend
 The Familiar of Zero
 The Idolm@ster Cinderella Girls
 The Idolm@ster Cinderella Girls Season 2
 The Melancholy of Haruhi Suzumiya
 To Love-Ru Darkness 2nd
 To Love-Ru Darkness 2nd Volume 2
 ViVid Strike!
 Vividred Operation
 Yuuna and the Haunted Hot Springs

Schwarz Side 

 Accel World
 Accel World: Infinite Burst
 Attack on Titan
 Attack on Titan Volume 2
 Bakemonogatari
 Batman Ninja
 Chain Chronicle ~Light of Haecceitas~
 Crayon Shin-chan
 Darling in the Franxx
 Detective Opera Milky Holmes
 Detective Opera Milky Holmes 2
 Detective Opera Milky Holmes Second Stage Edition
 Disgaea
 Fairy Tail
 Fate/Apocrypha
 Fate/kaleid liner Prisma Illya Zwei Herz!
 Fate/stay night
 Fate/stay night: Heaven's Feel
 Fate/stay night [Unlimited Blade Works]
 Fate/stay night [Unlimited Blade Works] Volume 2
 Fate/Zero
 Gargantia on the Verdurous Planet
 Goblin Slayer
 Guilty Crown
 Hatsune Miku: Project DIVA F
 Hatsune Miku: Project DIVA F 2nd
 JoJo's Bizarre Adventure: Golden Wind
 Kantai Collection
 Kantai Collection: Arrival of the European Fleet
 Kantai Collection: The Fifth Phase
 Kantai Collection: The Second Fleet
 Kill la Kill
 Kiznaiver
 Macross Frontier
 Melty Blood
 Monogatari Second Season
 Mr. Osomatsu
 Nisemonogatari
 Overlord
 Persona 3
 Persona 4
 Persona 5
 Project Sakura Wars 
 Puyo Puyo
 Rebuild of Evangelion
 Revue Starlight
 Revue Starlight Re:live
 Re:Zero − Starting Life in Another World
 Re:Zero − Starting Life in Another World Volume 2
 Re:Zero − Starting Life in Another World: Memory Snow
 Schoolgirl Strikers
 Sengoku Basara
 Shining Force EXA
 STAR WARS
 Steins;Gate
 Sword Art Online
 Sword Art Online Volume 2
 Sword Art Online Aliciziation
 Sword Art Online Alternative Gun Gale Online
 Sword Art Online Re:Edit
 Sword Art Online 10th Anniversary
 Sword Art Online: Ordinal Scale
 Tengen Toppa Gurren Lagann
 Terra Formars
 That Time I Got Reincarnated as a Slime
 The Fruit of Grisaia
 The Idolm@ster
 The Idolm@ster 2
 The Idolm@ster Anime
 The Idolm@ster Million Live!
 The Idolm@ster Movie
 The King of Fighters

Extra Pack/Extra Booster

Weiß Side 
 Angel Beats!
 Angel Beats! Volume 2
 CLANNAD Volume 1
 CLANNAD Volume 2
 CLANNAD Volume 3
 Da Capo Four Seasons
 Da Capo & Da Capo II Da Capo & Da Capo. II Plus Communication
 Da Capo II Plus Communication
 Da Capo III Anime
 Da Capo VS. Little Busters! Dog Days Dog Days Dash Dog Days Double Dash Hina Logic from Luck & Logic Hina Logic from Luck & Logic Volume 2
 Is the Order a Rabbit?? Little Busters! Card Mission Little Busters! Ecstasy Little Busters! Refrain Anime
 Love Live! Love Live! Sunshine!! Love Live! The School Idol Movie Magical Girl Lyrical Nanoha The MOVIE 1st Nichijou - My Ordinary Life Nisekoi Shakugan no Shana III -FINAL- The Familiar of Zero F The Girl Who Leapt Through Space/My-HiME & My-Otome The Girl Who Leapt Through Space/My-HiME & My-Otome Volume 2
 The Melancholy of Haruhi Suzumiya Schwarz Side 

 Black Rock Shooter CANAAN Devil Survivor 2: The Animation Disgaea 4 Disgaea D2 Fairy Tail Fate/hollow ataraxia Fate/kaleid liner Prisma Illya Fate/kaleid liner Prisma Illya Drei! Fate/kaleid liner Prisma Illya Zwei! Fate/Zero Gigant Big-Shot Tsukasa Godzilla The Animation Hatsune Miku ~Project DIVA~ X HD Katanagatari Kantai Collection: Fleet in the Deep Sea, Sighted! Log Horizon Psycho-Pass Milky Holmes: Genius 4 Counterattack Milky Holmes: Milky Holmes Strikes Back Milky Holmes: The Empire Strikes Back Persona 4 Persona 4: The Ultimate in Mayonaka Arena Persona 4: The Animation Persona Q: Shadow of the Labyrinth Rin-ne Sengoku Basara Anime
 Shining Resonance Sword Art Online II Sword Art Online II Volume 2
 The Idolm@ster Dearly Stars The Idolm@ster Mini Character Pack 765pro Wooser's Hand-to-Mouth Life Upcoming titles 

 Adventure Time Assault LilyBofuri: I Don't Want to Get Hurt, so I'll Max Out My Defense.Circus 20th Anniversary Date A Live Fate/Grand Order – Absolute Demonic Front: BabyloniaHololive
 Key 20th AnniversaryLost Decade Puella Magi Madoka Side Story: Magia Record Anime
 Mob Psycho 100 Re:Zero − Starting Life in Another World: Frozen Bonds RWBY Summer Pockets: Reflection Blue The Quintessential Quintuplets''

References

External links

Weiß Schwarz Card Translation Fanpage
American distributor / translator
Bushiroad English Blog
Bushi Navi English (Radio)

Bushiroad
Card games introduced in 2007
Japanese games
Collectible card games